Florence Lee can refer to:

 Florence Lee (born 1864), American actress
 Florence Lee (born 1888), American actress